Vibrio vulnificus is a species of Gram-negative, motile, curved rod-shaped (bacillus), pathogenic bacteria of the genus Vibrio. Present in marine environments such as estuaries, brackish ponds, or coastal areas, V. vulnificus is related to V. cholerae, the causative agent of cholera. At least one strain of V. vulnificus is bioluminescent.

Infection with V. vulnificus leads to rapidly expanding cellulitis or sepsis. It was first isolated as a source of disease in 1976.

Signs and symptoms
Vibrio vulnificus is an extremely virulent bacterium that can cause three types of infections:
 Acute gastroenteritis from eating raw or undercooked shellfish: V. vulnificus causes an infection often incurred after eating seafood, especially raw or undercooked oysters. It does not alter the appearance, taste, or odor of oysters. Symptoms include vomiting, diarrhea, and abdominal pain.
 Necrotizing wound infections can occur in injured skin exposed to contaminated marine water. V. vulnificus bacteria can enter the body through open wounds when swimming or wading in infected waters, or by puncture wounds from the spines of fishes such as stingrays.  People may develop a blistering dermatitis sometimes mistaken for pemphigus or pemphigoid.
 Invasive sepsis can occur after eating raw or undercooked shellfish, especially oysters. V. vulnificus is 80 times more likely to spread into the bloodstream in people with compromised immune systems, especially those with chronic liver disease. When this happens, severe symptoms including blistering skin lesions and septic shock can sometimes lead to death. This severe infection may occur regardless of whether the infection began from contaminated food or an open wound.

Among healthy people, ingestion of V. vulnificus can cause vomiting, diarrhea, and abdominal pain. In someone with a compromised immune system, particularly those with chronic liver disease, it can infect the bloodstream, causing a severe and life-threatening illness characterized by fever and chills, decreased blood pressure (septic shock), and blistering skin lesions. While men have been shown to be more at risk from this infection than women, co-morbidities such as alcoholic cirrhosis and diseases affecting the endocrine system (diabetes, rheumatoid arthritis, etc.) put a person far more at risk to develop infection from V. vulnificus.

Pathogenesis
Capsule: V. vulnificus has a capsule, made of  polysaccharides, and is thought to protect against phagocytosis.  The capsule also aids the bacteria in escaping opsonization.  Different strains of the bacteria are capable of shifting through the unencapsulated and encapsulated forms. Mouse models have shown that the unencapsulated forms are avirulent. These same strains however, are shown to have a higher predisposition to shift to the virulent encapsulated form when taken up by oysters.

Endotoxin: Like all gram negative bacteria, V. vulnificus has LPS (lipopolysaccharide as the major component of its outer membrane). However, the LPS the bacteria produces isn't as efficient at triggering the immune system's release of  tumor necrosis factor (TNF) alpha and other cytokines that produce shock syndromes. The capsular proteins the bacteria express however, are capable of producing an immune response contributing to shock syndrome.

Exotoxin: V. vulnificus produces a number of extracellular toxins such as metalloprotease VvpE, cytolysin/hemolysin VvhA, and the multifunctional autoprocessing repeats-in-toxins (MARTX) toxin. While the VvhA and MARTX toxin are factors in the bacteria's virulence, in vivo studies in mice suggest that the MARTX toxin is more responsible for bacterial dissemination from the intestine to produce sepsis.

Iron: Growth of V. vulnificus is dependent on the amount of iron that is accessible to the bacteria. The observed association of the infection with liver disease (associated with increased serum iron) might be due to the capability of more virulent strains to capture iron bound to transferrin.

Strains
The most harmful strains of V. vulnificus documented have been observed in three different forms. The first is in an anti-phagocytic polysaccharide capsule that protects the bacteria. By encapsulating the bacteria, phagocytosis and opsonization are not able to occur, thus allowing the bacteria to continue throughout the organism it is in. The second way that V. vulnificus has been most harmful is with some of the toxins that it creates. These toxins are not part of the infection that V. vulnificus causes but instead they are part of a secondary infection in the GI tract that most certainly will lead to systemic infection. Lastly, V. vulnificus has been seen to cause more harm in patients who have higher levels of iron.

Treatment
Vibrio vulnificus wound infections have a mortality rate around 25%. In people in whom the infection worsens into sepsis, typically following ingestion, the mortality rate rises to 50%. The majority of these people die within the first 48 hours of infection. The optimal treatment is not known, but in one retrospective study of 93 people in Taiwan, use of a third-generation cephalosporin and a tetracycline (e.g., ceftriaxone and doxycycline, respectively) was associated with an improved outcome.  Prospective clinical trials are needed to confirm this finding, but in vitro data support the suggestion that this combination is synergistic against V. vulnificus. Likewise, the American Medical Association and the Centers for Disease Control and Prevention  (CDC) recommend treating the person with a quinolone or intravenous doxycycline with ceftazidime. The first successful documented treatment of fulminant V. vulnificus sepsis was in 1995.  Treatment was ceftazidime and intravenous (IV) ciprofloxacin and IV doxycycline, which proved successful.  Prevention of secondary infections from respiratory failure and acute renal failure is crucial.  Key to the diagnosis and treatment were the early recognition of bullae in an immunocompromised person with liver cirrhosis and oyster ingestion within the previous 48 hours, and the request by the physician for STAT Gram staining and blood cultures for V. vulnificus.

Vibrio vulnificus often causes large, disfiguring ulcers that require extensive debridement or even amputation.

Prognosis
Vibrio vulnificus is the most common cause of death due to seafood in the United States, causing over 95% of deaths that are known to have occurred due to ingested seafood. If treatment with tetracycline or other cephalosporin antibiotics is initiated at the onset of symptoms and the full course followed, patients generally experience no long term effects.

The worst prognosis is in those people arriving at hospital in a state of shock. Total mortality in treated people (ingestion and wound) is around 33%.

People especially vulnerable are those with liver disease (especially cirrhosis and hepatitis) or immunocompromised states (some kinds of cancer, bone marrow suppression, HIV, diabetes, etc.). With these cases, V. vulnificus usually enters the bloodstream, where it may cause fever and chills, septic shock (with sharply decreased blood pressure), and blistering skin lesions. About half of those who contract blood infections die.

Vibrio vulnificus infections also disproportionately affect males; 85% of those developing endotoxic shock from the bacteria are male. Females having had an oophorectomy experienced increased mortality rates, as  estrogen has been shown experimentally to have a protective effect against V. vulnificus.

Epidemiology

Vibrio vulnificus is commonly found in the Gulf of Mexico, where more than a dozen people have died from the infection since 1990.  Most deaths at that time were occurring due to fulminant sepsis, either in the area of oyster harvest and ingestion, or in tourists returning home. Lack of disease recognition, and also of the risk factors, presentation, and cause, were and are major obstacles to good outcome and recovery.

After the successful treatment of the first person, the Florida Department of Health was able to trace  the origin of the outbreak to Apalachicola Bay oysters and their harvesting in water prone to excessive growth of the organism. This contamination was due to warmth of the water and change in freshwater dilution because of a change in flow of the Chattahoochee River into the Apalachicola River, and in turn into Apalachicola Bay.  A similar situation occurred after Hurricane Katrina in New Orleans.

Further treatment research
While the treatment for V. vulnificus can be as straightforward as making the rapid choice of appropriate antibiotics, there have been cases in which the genes mutated, thus rendering antibiotics ineffective. While looking for an answer to this problem, researchers found that one way to stop the infection from spreading is to again mutate the bacteria. This mutation happens on the flagellum of the bacteria. When injected with flgC and flgE (two genes in the flagella that cause the mutation), the flagellum no longer function properly. When unable to move normally, the bacteria is no longer able to spread toxins through the body, thus decreasing the effect that V. vulnificus has on the body systemically.

History
The pathogen was first isolated in 1976 from a series of blood culture samples submitted to the CDC in Atlanta. It was described as a "lactose-positive vibrio". It was subsequently given the initial name, Beneckea vulnifica, and finally, Vibrio vulnificus, by J. J. Farmer in 1979.

Increasing seasonal temperatures and decreasing coastal salinity levels seem to favor a greater concentration of Vibrio within filter-feeding shellfish of the U.S. Atlantic seaboard and the Gulf of Mexico, especially oysters (Crassostrea virginica).  Scientists have frequently demonstrated the presence of V. vulnificus in the gut of oysters and other shellfish and in the intestines of fish that inhabit oyster reefs. The vast majority of people who develop sepsis from V. vulnificus became ill after they ate raw oysters; most of these cases have been men.

In 2005, health officials clearly identified strains of V. vulnificus infections among evacuees from New Orleans due to the flooding there caused by Hurricane Katrina.

In 2015, in Florida, eight cases of V. vulnificus infection with two resulting in death were reported.

In 2022 following Hurricane Ian, Lee County, Florida saw a sharp rise in infections and deaths from V. vulnificus. By October 18, 2022, four deaths and 29 illnesses had been recorded since landfall of the hurricane in late September.

Natural transformation
Natural transformation is a bacterial adaptation for DNA transfer between individual cells.  V. vulnificus was found to become naturally transformable during growth on chitin in the form of crab shells.  The ability to now carry out transformation experiments in the laboratory should facilitate molecular genetic analysis of this opportunistic pathogen.

References

External links
 Large and detailed article on V. vulnificus at Todar's Online Textbook of Bacteriology
 CNN video on vibrio vulnificus
 Type strain of Vibrio vulnificus at BacDive -  the Bacterial Diversity Metadatabase

Bacterial diseases
Bacterium-related cutaneous conditions
Vibrionales
Waterborne diseases
Bacteria described in 1976
Marine microorganisms